A by-thirds Hyndburn Borough Council local election (postponed since March 2020, due to the Coronavirus outbreak), was held on Thursday 6 May 2021. Approximately one third of the local council's 35 seats fall up for election on that day.

This election, postponed for 12-months since 2020, took place at the same time as the regularly-scheduled 2021 Lancashire County Council elections and the rescheduled Lancashire Police & Crime Commissioner elections.

Background
Before the election Labour had a majority of 25 councillors, Conservatives had 7 councillors, with 1 Independent councillor who had previously been a Conservative and had since resigned from that party and become an Independent, plus 2 Vacant seats where after councillor Stephanie Haworth opted to stand-down (in 2020) her seat was left Vacant (during the covid pandemic) and the other suddenly became vacant (in March 2020) following the death of long-serving councillor Tony Dobson, who had also originally planned to stand-down (in 2020).

 Hyndburn's Conservative MP, Sara Britcliffe was previously elected in 2018 to one of the St. Andrew's HBC-ward seats AND that vacated seat's postponed by-election is due to take place in May-2021

In this election, Labour was defending 10-ward-seats and Conservatives were defending 3-ward-seats. The winning ward-candidates will serve out only the last 3-years of a standard 4-year term in office, with those same seats coming up for re-election, in May 2024, 12-months prior to the next LCC election, in May 2025.

Candidates were also standing as potential Reform Party ward-councillors in Netherton, Overton, Rishton and St Andrew's. Candidates were also standing as potential Lib-Dem Party ward-councillors in Rishton and St Oswald's. A single Candidate stood as a potential Independent ward-councillor in Rishton.  The Green Party did not stand candidates in any Hyndburn ward-seats and only contested LCC seats. There were no UKIP Candidates standing in any Hyndburn ward-seats, with just one such candidate for the Accrington North LCC-seat.

 Candidates standing for both a HBC-ward seat AND a LCC-seat - are tagged with "(& LCC)"

Local Election result

Reference: https://en.wikipedia.org/wiki/2016_Hyndburn_Borough_Council_election

NB: Four (of 16) Council wards, where seats were NOT be up for re-election in 2021, include the following wards - Clayton Le Moors, Huncoat, Immanuel in Oswaldtwistle and Milnshaw in Accrington. However, as there was ALSO an election previously scheduled for Lancashire's next Police and Crime Commissioner, polling stations in those other Four wards would normally ALSO have been OPEN to accept those ballots for a new Commissioner.

Previous Councillors who were looking to Stand-Down in May 2021 included - Stephanie Haworth (Lab-Overton), Jean Battle (Lab-Church) and Jeff Scales (Lab-Rishton).  As well as the (Con) Barnfield seat, which became vacant in March 2020 when Councillor Tony Dobson died.

Ward results

Altham

Barnfield

Baxenden

Central

Church

Netherton

Overton

Peel

Rishton

Spring Hill

St. Andrew's
 two-seats ... the winner of Sara's-2018 seat (*), will be up for re-election in May-2022, just 12-months later.

St. Oswald's

References

External links
Hyndburn Borough Council - Elections
Hyndburn Borough Council - Notice of Elections, May 6th-2021
Hyndburn Borough Council - Statement of Persons Nominated, May-2021
HBC Declaration of Results
Lancashire County Council - Elections 2021
Lancashire County Council - Statements of Persons Nominated (in Hyndburn), May-2021
LCC - Results Reports 2021
Electoral Commission - May 2021 elections guide
BBC elections - results for Hyndburn

Hyndburn
Hyndburn Borough Council elections
21st century in Lancashire